Imair Airlines was an airline based in Baku, Azerbaijan. It was a private airline operating international scheduled and charter passenger services from 1995 until its ceased operations on 23 November 2009. Its main base was Heydar Aliyev International Airport, Baku.

History

The airline was established on 6 October 1994 and started operations in July 1995. On 23 November 2009 the airline ceased operations and announced plans to sell its two remaining Tupolev-154 aircraft.

Destinations
Imair Airlines served the following destinations (at November 2009):

Azerbaijan
Baku - Heydar Aliyev International Airport Base
Kazakhstan
Almaty - Almaty International Airport
Nur-Sultan - Nursultan Nazarbayev International Airport
Russia
Surgut - Surgut Airport
Turkey
Bodrum - Milas–Bodrum Airport
Uzbekistan
Tashkent - Tashkent International Airport

Fleet
The Imair Airlines fleet included the following aircraft (at 23 November 2009)

2 Tupolev Tu-154M

References

External links
Imair Airlines

Defunct airlines of Azerbaijan
Airlines established in 1994
Airlines disestablished in 2009
1994 establishments in Azerbaijan